Acacia whitei  is a species of wattle native to north Queensland.

Taxonomy & naming 
A. whitei was first described by Joseph Maiden in 1918. The specific epithet, whitei, was given to honour the botanist Cyril Tenison White, who communicated the type specimen (from Stannary Hills) to Maiden.

References

whitei
Flora of Queensland
Taxa named by Joseph Maiden
Plants described in 1918